Trần Việt Hương (born 13 October 1998), is a Vietnamese female professional volleyball player. She currently plays for Bộ Tư lệnh Thông tin.

Clubs 
  Bộ Tư lệnh Thông tin

Awards

Clubs 
 2016 Vietnam League -  Runner-Up, with Thông tin Liên Việt Post Bank
 2017 Vietnam League -  Runner-Up, with Thông tin Liên Việt Post Bank
 2018 Vietnam League -  Runner-Up, with Thông tin Liên Việt Post Bank
 2019 Vietnam League -  Champion, with Thông tin Liên Việt Post Bank
 2020 Vietnam League -  Champion, with Thông tin Liên Việt Post Bank
 2021 Vietnam League -  Champion, with Bộ Tư lệnh Thông tin - FLC

National team

Senior team
 2021 SEA Games -  Silver Medal

U23 team
 2017 Asian Championship -  Bronze Medal

U20 team
 2016 ASEAN Championship -  Silver Medal

References

1998 births
People from Phú Thọ province
Vietnamese women's volleyball players
Living people
Vietnam women's international volleyball players
Middle blockers
21st-century Vietnamese women
Competitors at the 2021 Southeast Asian Games
Southeast Asian Games silver medalists for Vietnam
Southeast Asian Games medalists in volleyball